In English contract law, an agreement establishes the first stage in the existence of a contract. The three main elements of contractual formation are whether there is (1) offer and acceptance (agreement) (2) consideration (3) an intention to be legally bound.

One of the most famous cases on forming a contract is Carlill v Carbolic Smoke Ball Company, decided in nineteenth-century England. A medical firm advertised that its new wonder drug, a smoke ball, would cure people's flu, and if it did not, buyers would receive £100. When sued, Carbolic argued the ad was not to be taken as a serious, legally binding offer. It was merely an invitation to treat, and a gimmick. But the court of appeal held that it would appear to a reasonable man that Carbolic had made a serious offer. People had given good "consideration" for it by going to the "distinct inconvenience" of using a faulty product. "Read the advertisement how you will, and twist it about as you will," said Lindley LJ, "here is a distinct promise expressed in language which is perfectly unmistakable".

Offer

The most important feature of a contract is that one party makes an offer for a bargain that another accepts. This can be called a 'concurrence of wills' or a 'meeting of the minds' of two or more parties. There must be evidence that the parties had each from an objective perspective engaged in conduct manifesting their assent, and a contract will be formed when the parties have met such a requirement. An objective perspective means that it is only necessary that somebody gives the impression of offering or accepting contractual terms in the eyes of a reasonable person, not that they actually did want to contract.

Invitations to treat

Where a product in large quantities is advertised for in a newspaper or on a poster, it is generally regarded as an offer, however if the person who is to buy the advertised product is of importance, i.e. his personality etc., when buying e.g. land, it is merely an invitation to treat. In Carbolic Smoke Ball, the major difference was that a reward was included in the advertisement which is a general exception to the rule and is then treated as an offer. Whether something is classified as an offer or an invitation to treat depends on the type of agreement being made and the nature of the sale. In retail situations an item being present is normally considered an invitation to treat; this was established for items on display in shop windows in Fisher v Bell [1961] 1 QB 394 and for items on shelves in Pharmaceutical Society of Great Britain v Boots Cash Chemists (Southern) Ltd [1953] 1 QB 401.

Retail agreements can also be considered invitations to treat if there is simply not enough information in the initial statement for it to constitute an offer. In Partridge v Crittenden [1968] 1 WLR 1204 the defendant had placed an advertisement indicating that he had certain birds for sale, giving a price but no information about quantities. He was arrested under the Protection of Birds Act 1954 for 'offering such birds for sale'; it was ruled that since the advertisement did not specify the number of birds he had it could not constitute an offer; if it did he could have been legally bound to provide more birds than he possessed. The same principle was applied for catalogues in Grainger v Gough [1896] AC 325, when it was ruled that posting catalogues of items for sale to people did not constitute an offer since there was insufficient detail.

Chapelton v Barry UDC
Spencer v Harding (1870) LR 5 CP 561
Harvey v Facey [1893] AC 552

Offers generally
Carlill v Carbolic Smoke Ball Co. [1893] 1 QB 256

Auctions
Warlow v Harrison (1859) 1 E & E 309; 120 ER 925
Harris v Nickerson
Payne v Cave
Barry v Davies (t/a Heathcote Ball & Co) [2001] 1 All ER 944
Sale of Goods Act 1979, s 57(2)

Termination of offer

Revocation
Routledge v Grant (1828) 4 Bing 653; 130 ER 920: Grant offered to buy Routledge’s house, and laid down a requirement that his offer had to be accepted within six weeks. During that period he withdrew the offer. The court held that "the offeror was entitled to revoke his offer at any time prior to acceptance because no option agreement existed", which would have obliged Grant to keep the offer open.
Byrne v Van Tienhoven (1880) 5 CPD 344
Dickinson v Dodds [1876] 2 Ch D 463
Errington v Errington [1952] 1 KB 290

Rejection
An offer can be rejected by the offeree(s). An offer which is rejected is thereby extinguished: see Hyde v Wrench (1840) 3 Bea 334.

Lapse of time
When an offer is stated to be open for a specific length of time, the offer automatically terminates when it exceeds the time limit.
See:
Ramsgate Victoria Hotel v Montefiore (1866) LR 1 11 Ex 109
Manchester Diocesan Council for Education v Commercial Investments Ltd

Death
In Bradbury et al. v Morgan et al. (1862), the court ruled that a death does not in general operate to revoke a contract, although in exceptional cases it will do so.

Counter offers
Hyde v Wrench (1840) 3 Bea 334
Stevenson, Jacques & Co v McLean (1880) 5 QBD 346

Acceptance

Acceptance by conduct
Brogden v Metropolitan Railway Co (1877) 2 App Cas 666

Prescribed method of acceptance
Manchester Diocesan Council for Education v Commercial Investments Ltd [1969] 3 All ER 1593

Knowledge and reliance on offer
Williams v Carwardine (1833) 5 C & P 566; 172 ER 1101
Gibbons v Proctor
R v Clarke (1927) 40 CLR 227

Cross offers
A writes to B offering to sell certain property at a stated price. B writes to A offering to buy the same property at the same price. The letters cross in the post. Is there (a) an offer and acceptance, (b) a contract?

In this case, It is assumed that "where offers cross there was no binding contract". Because B's acceptance was not communicated to A. Therefore, there was no contract what so ever.
Tinn v Hoffman (1873) 29 LT 271

Battle of the forms
Butler Machine Tool Co Ltd v Ex-cello Cpn (England) Ltd [1979] 1 WLR 401

Acceptance in case of tenders
Harvela Investments Ltd v Royal Trust Co of Canada [1986] AC 207
Blackpool & Fylde Aero Club v Blackpool Borough Council [1990] 1 WLR 1195

Communication of acceptance

Necessity for communication

Waiver
Carlill v Carbolic Smoke Ball Co

Silence a condition of acceptance
Felthouse v Bindley (1862) 11 CBNS 869
Consumer Protection (Distance Selling) Regulations 2000 (SI 2000/2334) Reg 24

Post or telegram

Adams v Lindsell [1818] EWHC KB J59
Henthorn v Fraser [1892] 2 Ch 27
Holwell Securities Ltd v. Hughes [1974] 1 WLR 155

Telex
Entores Ltd v Miles Far East Corporation [1955] 2 QB 327
Brinkibon Ltd v. Stahag Stahl mbH [1983] 2 AC 34
The Brimnes [1975] QB 929

Revocation of Acceptance
Revocation can be made by the offeror only before acceptance is made. Also the revocation must be communicated to the offeree(s).Unless and until the revocation is communicated, it is ineffective. See:
Byrne v Van Tienhoven (1880) 5 CPD 344. 
Hudson ‘Retraction of Letters of Acceptance’ (1966) 82 Law Quarterly Review 169

Certainty and completeness

If the terms of the contract are uncertain or incomplete, the parties cannot have reached an agreement in the eyes of the law. An agreement to agree does not constitute a contract, and an inability to agree on key issues, which may include such things as price or safety, may cause the entire contract to fail. However, a court will attempt to give effect to commercial contracts where possible, by construing a reasonable construction of the contract (Hillas and Co Ltd v Arcos Ltd).

Courts may also look to external standards, which are either mentioned explicitly in the contract or implied by common practice in a certain field. In addition, the court may also imply a term; if price is excluded, the court may imply a reasonable price, with the exception of land, and second-hand goods, which are unique.

If there are uncertain or incomplete clauses in the contract, and all options in resolving its true meaning have failed, it may be possible to sever and void just those affected clauses if the contract includes a severability clause. The test of whether a clause is severable is an objective test—whether a reasonable person would see the contract standing even without the clauses.

Sale of Goods Act 1979 ss 8(2) 9

See also
English tort law
Consideration in English law
Powell v Lee (1908) 99 LT 284

Notes

External links

English contract law